St Faith’s is a village in the Umzumbe Local Municipality in the KwaZulu-Natal province of South Africa.

Geography 
St Faith's lies on the rolling hills of the KwaZulu-Natal South Coast, approximately 50 km north-west of Port Shepstone and 158 km south-west of Durban.
     
There are a number of settlements falling under St Faith’s: uMqangqala, Nothinwta, Dweshula, Thaleni, Ngoleleni, Zitendeni, Siqhingini, Junction, Diphini, Maromeni and Ivethe.

Infrastructure 
Junction is the main part of St Faith’s, it hosts a police station and health clinic near the St Faith’s Community Hall. Maria Cross, Khakhamela, St Faith’s, Impola are the primary schools, Indlelenhle Secondary and Mayiyana, Ntabalukhozi are the High Schools in St Faith’s.

Transport 
A taxi rank in Junction serves routes to Durban, Port Shepstone, Highflats and Ixopo. The route is also used by Ugu Transport buses. St Faith's main road connects the village to the N2 highway and Port Shepstone in the south-west and Highflats in the north.

References

Populated places in the Umzumbe Local Municipality
KwaZulu-Natal South Coast